Mansour Raeisi (1928–1980) was an Iranian Olympician Freestyle Wrestler and FILA International Referee.
He is one of the most notable Iranian wrestlers of his generation.

He represented Iran at 1948 Summer Olympics –the first appearance of Iranian wrestlers in an International competition– and had the best performance among Iranian wrestlers in the games, losing semifinal to Turkish silver-medalist Halit Balamir and placing in the 4th place.

He also coached Iran national freestyle wrestling athletes in 1967 World Wrestling Championships.

Deaflympics champion Karim Raeisinia is his cousin.

References

External links 
 Profile at sports-reference.com

1928 births
1980 deaths
People from Tehran
Olympic wrestlers of Iran
Wrestlers at the 1948 Summer Olympics
Iranian male sport wrestlers
20th-century Iranian people